Two ships of the Imperial Japanese Navy were named Fuji:

 , a  launched in 1896 and stricken in 1922
 , a  launched in 1920 and scrapped in 1946

Imperial Japanese Navy ship names
Japanese Navy ship names